Apesanahkwat (born January 19, 1949) is a Native American tribal leader, activist, father, and a film and television actor.

Apesanahkwat served as tribal chairman of the Menominee Indian Reservation eight times. He served in the United States Marine Corps and is a Vietnam War veteran. He is known for playing American Indian roles in such films and television series as Wind River, Northern Exposure, Stolen Women, Captured Hearts, Bagdad Cafe, and Babylon 5. He has competed in various Powwows across the United States as a northern traditional dancer.

Involvement in Native American Politics

Contribution as Menominee Chairman 
Apesanahkwat has been nominated as the Menominee Nation’s chairman a total of eight times. In one of these occasions, Apesanahkwat was reelected after serving in prison for six months, for an alleged drug problem. As chairman, Apesanahkwat has actively spoken several times about injustices Indian tribes face. One of these times being in 1989, during a rally at Lac du Flambeau where he protested against racism towards indigenous groups. As chairman, Apesanahkwat has also presented the Menominee tribe at a congress level, such as the "Indian Tribal Conflict Resolution, Tort Claims and Risk Management Act of 1998."

Activism 
On March of 2004, Apesanahkwat was the official key note speaker at the Language and Culture Preservation Conference in Albuquerque, New Mexico which was hosted by the Bureau of Indian Affair's Office of Indian Education Programs(OIEP). This event was meant to spread awareness of the importance of preserving Indian culture though language. Being the keynote speaker, Apesanahkwat called to action his community, stating the importance of giving back the Indian people their voice. Apesanahkwat is also known to be one of the originators of the Indian Gaming Regulatory Act(GRA).

Military History

Vietnam War 
Apesanhkwat was twenty years old when he entered the Vietnam War. After the war ended, Apesanahkwat suffered from PTSD(post traumatic stress disorder). After his traumatic experiences at war, he reconnected with his indigenous roots as a form of healing. When discussing his thoughts on war, Apesanahkwat says he believes that no man should have to experience it. Since Vietnam, he has been an active voice for his community as a supporter for PTSD awareness.

Filmography

Film

Television

Notes

References
1. "War to a Warrior - a journey home" 

2. "Green Bay Press-Gazette 19 Apr 1997, page Page 1" Newspapers.com. Retrieved 2023-02-21

3. "Indigenous Education Columns" jan.ucc.nau.edu. Retrieved 2023-02-22.

4. "Indian Tribal Conflict Resolution and Tort Claims and Risk Management Act of 1998" Retrieved 2023-03-05

External links

Living people
Native American male actors
American male television actors
American male film actors
Native American activists
Menominee people
People from Keshena, Wisconsin
Male actors from Wisconsin
Native American leaders
Military personnel from Wisconsin
United States Marines
20th-century American male actors
21st-century American male actors
United States Marine Corps personnel of the Vietnam War
1949 births
20th-century Native Americans
21st-century Native Americans